You and Me at Home is an album by American musician John Hartford, released in 1980 (see 1980 in music).

Track listing
"You and Me at Home"
"Tonite We're Gonna Boogie"
"Your Stuff"
"River of Life"
"Ladies Live Such a Long Long Time"
"Once You've Had the Best"
"Don't Go Away"
"I Believe In You"
"My Love for You"
"Imagination Fired by Books"
"You and Me Reprised"

Personnel
John Hartford – vocals, fiddle

References

External links
LP Discography of John Hartford.

John Hartford albums
1980 albums